The Bullhead Point Historical and Archaeological District is located in Sturgeon Bay, Wisconsin.

Description
The district includes the remains of three ships in shallow water. They are visible from the shore during periods of lower lake levels.<ref>Of Limestone and Labor: Shipwrecks of the Stone Trade by Bradley A. Rodgers and Russell T. Green, Research Report #11. Greenville, NC: East Carolina University, 2003, page 7 (page 17 of the pdf)</ref> All hauled limestone for the Sturgeon Bay Stone Company at the ends of their lives and were burned in 1931. They are the 212-foot steamer Empire State built in 1862, the 134-foot centerboard schooner Oak Leaf, and the 168-foot schooner-barge Ida Corning''.

References

Historic districts on the National Register of Historic Places in Wisconsin
Shipwrecks on the National Register of Historic Places in Wisconsin
National Register of Historic Places in Door County, Wisconsin
Shipwrecks of the Wisconsin coast
Shipwrecks of Lake Michigan
Wreck diving sites in the United States